Sardaar Gabbar Singh is a 2016 Indian Telugu-language action comedy film directed by K. S. Ravindra, based on an original story and screenplay by Pawan Kalyan. A sequel to Gabbar Singh (2012), it stars Pawan Kalyan reprising his role from the previous film alongside Kajal Aggarwal and Sharad Kelkar (his Telugu debut). In the film, brave policeman Gabbar Singh (Kalyan) rescues the residents of Rathanpur when they are forced to face the wrath of Bhairav Singh (Kelkar), who unceremoniously usurps their land.

Initially titled Gabbar Singh 2, the film began production on 21 February 2014 in Hyderabad with Sampath Nandi as the film. He later walked out of the film and was then replaced by Ravindra. Principal photography began in May 2015 at Maharashtra. The film was renamed Sardaar Gabbar Singh in mid-2015. Filming took place extensively in Hyderabad, Secunderabad, Gujarat and Kerala before concluding in March 2016. Devi Sri Prasad composed the film's music, while Arthur A. Wilson and Gautham Raju served as the cinematographer and editor, respectively.

Sardaar Gabbar Singh was released worldwide on 8 April 2016, along with a Hindi dubbed version, on a screen count of 2,600 thus becoming the second biggest Telugu release after Baahubali: The Beginning (2015). It received overwhelmingly negative reviews from critics, and was a commercial disaster owing to high distribution costs.

Premise
A kingdom called Ratanpur is taken ruthlessly by a crime lord Bhairav Singh. The princess of the kingdom is named Arshi Devi, and the whole kingdom is afraid of Bhairav Singh. Then a maverick cop Sardaar Gabbar Singh came along and put an end to all of the worryings.

Cast 

 Pawan Kalyan as Sardaar Gabbar Singh
 Sathwik Varma as Young Gabbar Singh/Sardaar
 Kajal Aggarwal as Arshi Devi
 Sharad Kelkar as Raja Bhairav Singh
 Sanjjanaa Galrani as Gayathri, Bhairav Singh's wife
 Brahmanandam as Shekhar Singh Chauhan Rajput
 Ali as Samba
 Tanikella Bharani as Gabbar Singh's adopted uncle
 Mukesh Rishi as Hari Narayana 
 Rao Ramesh as Ramesh Talwar
 Pradeep Rawat as Bhairav Singh's father
 Kabir Duhan Singh as Dhanu
 Urvashi as Madhumati
 Tisca Chopra as Geetha Devi
 Pooja Ramachandran as a girl in Ratanpur
 Posani Krishna Murali as Appaji (Sketch Master)
 Brahmaji as Raja Manikhyam IPS (Corrupted Police Officer)
 Sudigali Sudheer as Police Constable
 Raghu Babu as Govinda
 Dheer Charan Srivastav as Hakeem
 Prabhas Sreenu
 Krishna Bhagavan
 Vineet Kumar
 Salim Baig
 Charandeep
 Narra Srinivas
 Ashwini
 Aravind
 Shakalaka Shankar
 RK as Matka Seenu
 Raai Laxmi as herself cameo appearance in the song "Tauba Tauba"

Production

Development 
In October 2012, Pawan Kalyan agreed to act in a film produced by Sharrath Marar, the former CEO of MAA TV, after completing work on Trivikram Srinivas' Attarintiki Daredi (2013). Before the theatrical release of Dabangg 2 (2012), producer Bandla Ganesh registered the title Gabbar Singh in Hyderabad at the Andhra Pradesh Film Chamber which fuelled speculations that this would be the remake of Dabangg 2 and the sequel of Gabbar Singh (2012), which itself was the official Telugu remake of Dabangg featuring Kalyan, Shruti Haasan and Abhimanyu Singh reprising the respective roles played by Salman Khan, Sonakshi Sinha and Sonu Sood in the original. Devi Sri Prasad and Jayanan Vincent were retained as the film's music director and cinematographer from the prequel's technical crew. Sampath Nandi was chosen to direct the film and Marar was announced to execute the film's production. At the same time, the film was reported to have a fresh storyline.

Besides producing the film, Kalyan himself wrote the story and made it clear to his team that Gabbar Singh sequel would be based on an original script and would not be a remake of Dabangg 2. Considering the response generated by Attarintiki Daredi and the subsequent change in his on-screen image, Kalyan put the pre-production activities on hold and made changes to the script. Some elements of family drama were added, and the aggression and expressions of the lead character were toned down. Kalyan also opted to complete his work on Kishore Kumar Pardasany's Gopala Gopala (2015) first and Nandi meanwhile planned to produce the film Galipatam (2014) on a low budget.

The film's official launch ceremony took place on 21 February 2014 at Hyderabad and was tentatively titled Gabbar Singh 2. L. Satyanand supervised the film's script and was assisted by Sridhar Seepana and Kishore Gopu. Harish Pai was chosen as the film's creative head and Gautham Raju was signed to edit the film. Due to delay in finalising the female lead, Kalyan was reportedly upset and joined the sets of Gopala Gopala and start works related to his political outfit Jana Sena Party. The crew of the film were instructed to regroup when Kalyan summons them. Nandi walked out of the film in November 2014 and refused to reveal the reasons, saying that he is not authorised to speak about the same. Vincent suggested K. S. Ravindra to Kalyan who was impressed with his narrative skills and finalised him as the new director. Sai Madhav Burra was chosen to write the film's dialogues.

The film was renamed to Sardaar in late July 2015 in order to avoid paying royalty to the title Gabbar Singh to a Mumbai-based studio that held the rights of the title. Kalyan chose this title since the character of Gabbar Singh played by Amjad Khan was referred to by his henchmen as Sardaar in Sholay (1975). Eros International announced on 15 August 2015 to IANS that it would co-produce the film in association with Pawan Kalyan Creative Works and Northstar Entertainment Pvt. Ltd. and the film's title was renamed to Sardaar Gabbar Singh. Arthur A. Wilson replaced Vincent as the film's cinematographer due to clash of opinions between the latter and Ravindra.

Casting 
Kalyan sported a long hair and thick beard for a few important sequences in the film and a clean shaven look for the rest of the film. The makers considered to sign a new actress after considering Samantha Ruth Prabhu, Pranitha Subhash and Anushka Sharma for the same. Shruti Haasan and Asin were approached to play the female lead in the film. Navneet Kaur Dhillon was reported to be signed as the female lead in late May 2014. Akshara Haasan was approached for the same later who declined the offer gently saying that it would raise expectations on her next films and so responsibilities. Deepika Padukone, Sonakshi Sinha, Parineeti Chopra and Katrina Kaif were approached for the female lead role who turned down the offer citing unavailability of bulk dates and Anisha Ambrose, who made a cameo appearance in Gopala Gopala, was chosen by Kalyan as the female lead.

Ambrose was trained in the nuances of acting, perfecting dancing and several other aspects in the workshop sessions conducted by Ravindra in April 2015 before joining the film's sets. During the shoot of the first schedule, the makers saw Sharad Kelkar performance in a soap opera and approached him to play the antagonist. Kelkar's inclusion in the cast was confirmed in June 2015. Charandeep, known for his work in the films Jilla (2014) and Pataas (2015), was signed as one of the antagonists in the film. Kajal Aggarwal, who initially declined to be a part of the film two years ago due to scheduling conflicts, was approached again in August 2015 for the female lead role. She met the film's unit and gave her consent, marking her first collaboration with Kalyan.

Kabir Duhan Singh confirmed his inclusion in the film's cast after completing a schedule and said that he would be seen as the one who handles all the activities of Kelkar in the film. During the scripting stage, there was a shorter role for a second, parallel female lead which was developed by the creative team on par with the first female lead after the shooting began. A source from the film's unit called it a "very energetic and active character". Trisha Krishnan was approached for the same in mid April 2015. Raai Laxmi inclusion in the film's cast was confirmed on 2 September 2015. She was reported to play a crucial role in the film and to be appeared in a special song along with Kalyan. Speaking about her role, Laxmi said that her role is a crucial one and shall stay till the end of the film, adding that it "starts off as something in the beginning, it transitions into something else altogether as the movie unfolds".

Sanjjanaa was signed to play the role of a Gujarati princess in the film who subserviently follows her husband. She called it an important character with a "traditional and royal persona", adding that it is not "one of those blink-and-miss roles" and will be seen right from the start to the end. The film's unit revealed that her wardrobe consists largely of nine-yard sarees and heavy jewellery. In mid March 2016, Kajal revealed that she would be seen as a princess, who was from another era dressed in exquisite Indian attires which is a very contemporary character unlike Indu from Magadheera (2009).

Filming 
Anand Sai and Rajesh and Archa Mehta were signed as the film's art director and costume designer respectively. Bhaskar Raju was signed as the film's production controller. The film's shoot began on 29 May 2015 at Malshej Ghat in Maharashtra. Some important sequences of the first schedule were shot in a special village set and Kalyan was expected to join the sets from the first week of June. The film's unit took a break after completing the first schedule since Kalyan was busy with his political commitments. A fight sequence featuring Kalyan and others were shot at the Aluminium factory located in Gachibowli in late July 2015. The second schedule was wrapped up on 5 August 2015, and filming continued at Ameerpet in mid August 2015.

The third schedule commenced on 8 September 2015 at Ramoji Film City, Hyderabad where key scenes were shot. Kalyan joined the film's sets on the next day and the schedule lasted till the end of September 2015. Filming of the item number commenced on 30 September 2015 in a set erected by Brahma Kadali at Ramanaidu Studios in Nanakramguda. Laxmi however chose not to call it an item number and termed it an "inspirational song that will everyone will love and remember for a long time". The song's shoot was wrapped up on 8 October 2015. Kalyan and the film's unit left for Gujarat in late October 2015 for location scouting. They returned to Hyderabad shortly and the next schedule commenced from 1 November 2015.

Few scenes on Kalyan, Ali, Brahmaji and others were filmed near the Le Palais Royal and Crown Villa Gardens in Secunderabad. A 25-day long schedule began from 15 November 2015 at Gujarat. Ali and Brahmaji joined the film's shoot shortly. Kajal joined the film's sets at Vadodara on 27 November 2015 and few scenes featuring her and Kalyan were filmed. She completed her part in the schedule on 4 December 2015. Kabir Singh Duhan joined the film's sets on the next day and scenes featuring him and Kalyan were filmed. After Kalyan completed his portions and left for Hyderabad, Marar said that scenes on the remaining cast would be filmed at Rajkot in Gujarat.

The final schedule, starting on 4 January 2016 at Hyderabad, was announced to last for a month and on its completion, the film's post-production activities were planned to be commenced. A village set worth 20 million was erected in Hyderabad for the same in the place where Gabbar Singh was filmed. A schedule of 20 days was planned and all the principal cast participated in the shoot. The set featured an elaborate railway track, a market, and a group of houses and the cost escalated to 45 million. Upon its completion, the next schedule commenced in Kerala in February 2016 and few portions were filmed at the Athirappilly Falls. Upon its completion, the film's shoot continued in Hyderabad and by mid-February 2016, 90% of the film's talkie part was wrapped up.

After filming a marriage sequence on Kalyan and Kajal, a horse fair sequence, which forms a part of the climax, was filmed at Ramoji Film City in late February 2016. 100 horses, horsemen, many junior artists and a crew supporting three units worked simultaneously. 1000 members formed the teams and 40 artists from the film were present along with the horses, ten vintage cars, and many luxury cars. The pre-climax sequences were filmed in early March 2016 and a set was erected for the same. An elaborate sequence paying homage to Chiranjeevi was performed by Kalyan who was trained by a choreographer to ensure perfection. The filming of the climax sequences was resumed shortly. A duet on Kalyan and Kajal was filmed at Switzerland from 24 March 2016, upon whose completion, the principal photography was wrapped up.

Music 

The film's soundtrack is composed by Devi Sri Prasad, who also scored music for its predecessor Gabbar Singh (2012). The soundtrack album features six tracks, with lyrics written by Ananta Sriram, Ramajogayya Sastry and Prasad himself. He remixed a popular song "Naa Koka Baagunda" from the Chiranjeevi-starrer Kondaveeti Raja (1986) for this film. Although being rumoured that the soundtrack will be released at a launch event held in Amaravati (the new capital city of Andhra Pradesh), the soundtrack was released on 20 March 2016, at H.I.C.C. Novotel in Hyderabad. Pawan Kalyan's elder brother, Chiranjeevi attended as chief guest. The album was released by Eros Music, the same day on streaming platforms.

The album received mixed reviews from critics. 123Telugu gave a positive review stating that the film has "a well packaged album from DSP". Behindwoods gave 2.5 out of 5 and stated "an average album from DSP". Indiaglitz gave 2.75 out of 5 and stated "A complete album for the masses and classes alike". Moviecrow gave 2.75 out of 5 stating "DSP's Sardaar Gabbar Singh has nothing extraordinary to offer and the tunes are largely tepid and run of the mill one". Bollywood Life gave 2.5 out of 5 stating "The album of Sardaar Gabbar Singh is decent but was bit of a let down".

Marketing 
On the occasion of Pawan Kalyan's birthday (2 September 2015), the makers unveiled the first look poster and teaser through social media. On 14 January 2016, coincidinge with Sankranthi, the producer Sharath Marar unveiled three posters and a teaser though social media and YouTube. The second teaser crossed one million views upon its release through YouTube. Another teaser of the film was launched on 14 March 2016, through Telugu and Hindi, was well received by audiences. The trailer of Sardaar Gabbar Singh, was released on 20 March 2016, which coincided the audio launch function held in Hyderabad.

Release

Theatrical 
Sardaar Gabbar Singh was released on 8 April 2016, coinciding with Ugadi. However, in order to avoid clash with Allu Arjun's Sarrainodu and Mahesh Babu's Brahmotsavam, the makers postponed the release to 11 May 2016, the date where its predecessor Gabbar Singh (2012) was released. In January 2016, the makers rescheduled the release date to 8 April 2016. On 14 March 2016, Eros International which acquired the theatrical rights, also planned to release a Hindi dubbed version on the same day of its Telugu original's release date. Kalyan said in a statement that this film has a universal story and film making cannot be confined to a certain area or demographics and our film attempts a unique connect with India, especially the Hindi belt.

Screening and statics 
Sardaar Gabbar Singh was released in more than 2600 screens worldwide, with 1800 theatres across India, and 800 theatres overseas, thus becoming the second biggest release from Telugu cinema, after Baahubali: The Beginning (2015). The advance bookings of the film kickstarted on 4 April 2016 before release, which had 100% of tickets being sold in the opening day, and 85% of the tickets in the opening weekend. The film had a biggest release in USA, with 100 theatres across 14 states, and was premiered on 7 April 2016, before the Indian release. Also the film is releasing globally in 42 countries marking the first Telugu film to release in that many countries.

Distribution 
Eros International acquired the worldwide theatrical, digital, Hindi dubbing and music rights, apart from co-producing the film. The distribution rights of Nizam region were acquired by Dilip Tandon of Indra Films for 21 crore. The Ceded rights were sold to Narasimha Prasad Films for 10.5 crore; Vizag theatrical rights were sold to Kanthi Krishna Films for 7.2 crore. Godavari East and West thearical rights were sold to Anusri Films for 5.4 crore and Shanumka Films for 4.4 crore respectively. Guntur theatrical rights were sold for SV Cinemas for 5.5 crore. Krishna theatrical rights were sold to Tollywood Creations to an amount of 4.3 crore, while Nellore rights of the film were sold to SLNS Pictures for 2.7 crore. Karnataka theatrical rights were sold to Mars Pictures for 8.5 crore. Bhadrakali Pictures acquired the Tamil Nadu theatrical rights for 1.2 crore and The Hindi dubbing and North India release rights were secured by Eros for 6 crore. Overseas theatrical rights were sold to iDream Media for 10.5 crore; thus the film earned 87.2 crore from theatrical rights alone.

Home media 
The television rights of the film were secured by Star India for 21 crore, along with its Hindi dubbed version. The film had a premiere on Star Maa on 17 July 2016, where it registered a TRP rating of 15.24, close to Baahubali: The Beginning and Srimanthudu (which had scored TRP ratings of 21.84 and 21.24 respectively).

Reception

Box office

India
Sardaar Gabbar Singh registered a opening of 35 crore from the domestic box office (Andhra Pradesh and Telangana), with a share of 26 crore for its distributors. The film became the biggest opener for a Kalyan-starrer, surpassing Attarintiki Daredi (2013), which earlier earned 26.75 crore at the box office.

Further, Sardaar Gabbar Singh, surpassed Srimanthudu (2015), to become the second highest opener, after Baahubali: The Beginning (2015). However, the mixed word-of-mouth, have affected the collections, where it saw a dip in the box office in the second day. The film managed to collect 57 crore in the second weekend. As of 10 days, the film grossed approximately ₹140 crore against a budget of ₹75 at the worldwide box office by the end of its lifetime. With a total share of 80 crore to its distributors.

Other territories
The film premiered in 300 screens in North America on 7 April, where it collected $615,853 (4.10 crore) at the U.S. box office. As of 10 days, the film has earned  $1,058,000 (7.04 crore).

Critical response
Sardaar Gabbar Singh received a mixed responses from critics.

Writing for The Times of India, Pranita Jonnalagada gave the film 2.5 out of 5 and stated, "This film surely is about a lot of guts (such lazy direction, anyone?), guns (even in songs!) and love (Pawan Kalyan has adorably dedicated this film to his fans)." A critic from Sify gave 2.75 out of 5 and stated "Pawan's show and Kajal are saving grace but narration is a letdown. Despite a good interval bang, post interval it drags on without much redeeming factors." Sreedhar Pillai of Firstpost summarised "Sardaar Gabbar Singh is strictly targeted at Pawan Kalyan’s huge fan base. It is all sound and fury, with no story and goes on and on." Karthik Keramalu of News18 gave the film 2.5 out of 5 satting that "The film's story loses its focus mid-way." Nandini Ramanath of Scroll, stated "Kalyan, who has written the movie, doesn’t only want to please his fans. He appears to be campaign mode (In real life, Kalyan is also a politician and is the founder of the Jana Sena Party). Scenes in Sardaar Gabbar Singh stink of electioneering and dialogues are of pure sloganeering. At 163 minutes then, Sardaar Gabbar Singh is one of the longest propaganda videos out there." Indiaglitz gave the film 3 out of 5 stating, "Pawan's one-man show.  For those of you looking for him to do non-heroic comedy in khaki, this film has much stuff on platter."

A critic from The Indian Express, criticised the screenplay stating that "Sardaar Gabbar Singh is so lazily written that it is literally a struggle to sit through the film." Haricharan Pudipeddi of Hindustan Times gave a rating of 2 out of 5 stating "Even though Pawan Kalyan the actor shines in Sardaar Gabbar Singh, the writer fails miserably, and there’s so much he needs to learn from this debacle." Suresh Kavirayani of Deccan Chronicle gave the film 2.5 out of 5 stating "The film leaves one with the feeling that something was missing, perhaps the magic of Pawan Kalyan." Sangeetha Devi Dundoo of The Hindu stated "The film lacks a taut screenplay that can string together crowd-pleasing moments." Bollywood Life gave the film 2 out of 5 stating "Sardaar Gabbar Singh is definitely not worth the hype it has been receiving." Behindwoods gave the film a rating of 2.25 out of 5 stating, "Pawan Kalyan show all the way! But that's just not enough." Daily News and Analysis gave the film 2.5 out of 5  stating "It may be Pawan Kalyan’s take on the classic Sholay, but this movie is only for Pawan Kalyan fans."

References

External links 
 

2016 films
2016 masala films
Films about mining
Works about mining
2016 action comedy films
Indian sequel films
2010s Telugu-language films
Films shot in Telangana
Films shot in Gujarat
Films shot in Maharashtra
Films scored by Devi Sri Prasad
Fictional portrayals of the Telangana Police
Fictional portrayals of the Andhra Pradesh Police
Films shot in Switzerland
Films shot at Ramoji Film City
Law enforcement in fiction
Indian action comedy films
Indian police films
2016 comedy films